Gnorimus variabilis, also known as the variable chafer, is a species of scarab beetle belonging to the subfamily Cetoniinae, the flower chafers. It was first described by Carl Linnaeus in 1758.  The species is native to Europe and is usually found in oak and beech woods or parkland.

Habitat
When the Gnorimus variabilis is a larva, it develops in wood mold like the trunks or the branches. Normally, larvae had a growing time of around 2 years. However that can depend on the environmental situation. Gnorimus variabilis is located in particular areas in different countries. For instance, it maybe found in conifers in Southern Europe. In the United Kingdom, it may be hidden in the old open-grown oak Quercus trees. In Spain, they may be located in oak forests and chestnut forests. In France, larvae lives in the wood mold of tree cavities, mainly Castanea and Quercus. In Ukraine, the larvae develops in wood and stubs of oak Quercus, chestnut Castanea, willow Salix, and alder Alnus.

Gallery

References

External links
 
 

Cetoniinae
Beetles described in 1758
Endemic fauna of Costa Rica
Beetles of Europe
Taxa named by Carl Linnaeus